The Devil's Daughter is a 1973 American made-for-television horror film starring Shelley Winters, Belinda Montgomery and Robert Foxworth. It originally aired as the ABC Movie of the Week on January 9, 1973.

It was an early screenwriting credit for Colin Higgins.

Plot
Diane is a young woman (played by Belinda Montgomery) who attends the funeral of her mother. One of her mother's old friends, a wealthy woman named Lilith (Shelley Winters), introduces her to a Satanic cult (her mother was part of this cult before leaving it while Diane was a baby). The cult members have been keeping track of Diane (unbeknownst to her) throughout her childhood and teenage years, and believe her to be their "princess of darkness," insisting she take that role, which Diane rejects, horrified. Several strange things happen to Diane and her friends as the cult tries to take control over her. Diane eventually meets Steve, a charming young man (Robert Foxworth), and as she falls in love with him, feels she can defy the cult and live her own life. On her wedding day, Diane learns, to her shock and horror, that there are sinister conditions for the marriage, making her destiny unavoidable when she finds out that Steve is really a demon prince.

Cast 
  Shelley Winters 	as Lilith Malone
  Belinda Montgomery as Diane Shaw 
  Robert Foxworth 	as Steve Stone
  Jonathan Frid 	as Mr. Howard 
  Martha Scott 	as Mrs. Stone
  Joseph Cotten 	as Judge Weatherby
  Barbara Sammeth 	as Susan Sanford
  Diane Ladd 	as Alice Shaw 
  Lucille Benson 	as Janet Poole
  Thelma Carpenter as Margaret Poole
  Abe Vigoda 	as Alikhine
  Ian Wolfe 	as Father MacHugh
  Robert Cornthwaite as Pastor Dixon
  Rozelle Gayle 	as Fedora

Production
The movie was filmed in Pacific Grove, California and Paramount Studios in Hollywood, California.

Reception
The Los Angeles Times said it "had about as much suspense as the Nixon-McGovern race." The New York Times called it "one of the better made for TV movies."

Legacy
Higgins later described the script as "just a job".  However producers Milkis and Miller enjoyed working with Higgins and commissioned him to write a Hitchcock style thriller. This became Silver Streak.

See also
 List of American films of 1973

References

External links

1973 television films
1973 films
1973 horror films
American horror television films
Films directed by Jeannot Szwarc
Films with screenplays by Colin Higgins
ABC Movie of the Week
Films scored by Laurence Rosenthal
1970s American films